Nebria reitteri is a species of ground beetle in the Nebriinae subfamily that can be found in Romania and Ukraine.

References

External links
Nebria reitteri at Fauna Europaea

reitteri
Beetles described in 1902
Beetles of Europe